Miquel may refer to:
 the Catalan form of the given name Michael
 Friedrich Anton Wilhelm Miquel (1811–1871), a Dutch botanist
 Gérard Miquel (born 1946), a member of the Senate of France
 Ignasi Miquel (born 1992), a Spanish football player
Joaquín Miquel (1903–1929), Spanish Olympic runner
 Johann von Miquel (1828–1901), a German statesman
 Miquel's theorem, a result in geometry, named after Auguste Miquel
 Miquel Brown (born 1945), a Canadian actress and disco/soul singer

See also
Sant Miquel (disambiguation)